R.B. Stall High School is a public high school in North Charleston, South Carolina (Charleston postal address). It is a part of the Charleston County School District (CCSD).

History
At one point Stall High School moved to a new location. It continued using the stadium at the old location until a new CCSD stadium opened.

Academic performance
From circa 2016 it has been a "Capturing Kids' Hearts" showcase school. By 2020 the school had an increase in its graduation rate to 75%, when it was previously around 63-64%.

Notable alumni
 Tim Scott (Class of 1983) - U.S. Senator (Republican Party)
 Scott went to Stall High to give speeches about his experiences.

References

Further reading

External links
 R.B. Stall High School
 R.B. Stall High School, Charleston County School District - Mcmillan Pazdan Smith Architecture

Public high schools in South Carolina
North Charleston, South Carolina